{{Nihongo|Heaven's Coin<ref name="NTV1&2">{{cite web |title=Heaven's Coin''' |url=https://www.ntv.co.jp/english/pc/2012/03/heavens-coin.html |publisher=Nippon TV |access-date=8 September 2022}}</ref>|星の金貨 ―Die Sterntaler―|Hoshi no Kinka| "Stars' Coins"}} is a 1995 Japanese television drama series. After Shūichi leaves for Tokyo, he has an accident and loses his memory. Aya travels to Tokyo and encounters , Shūichi's brother.

The sequel series, aired in 1996, continues where the previous series left off.

The third series, which ran for 11 episodes in 2001, uses a new set of characters, starring Mari Hoshino as the deaf heroine.

The opening theme for the original season is "Aoi Usagi" by Noriko Sakai. The opening theme for Heaven's Coin: Part 2'' is "Kagami no Dress", also by Sakai.

Characters

Heaven's Coin
 Aya Kuramoto – Noriko Sakai
 Shūichi Nagai – Takao Osawa
 Takumi Nagai – Yutaka Takenouchi
  – Minako Tanaka
  – Naomi Hosokawa
  – Raita Ryū
  – Tomomi Nishimura

Heaven's Coin: Part 2
 Aya Kuramoto – Noriko Sakai
 Shūichi Nagai – Takao Osawa
 Takumi Nagai – Yutaka Takenouchi
  – Naho Toda
  – Ikki Sawamura
 Miwa Koizumi – Minako Tanaka
 Shōko Yūki – Naomi Hosokawa
  – Mai Hōshō

References

External links

 Heaven's Coin Part 1 and Part 2 at NTV 
 Heaven's Coin Part 3 at NTV  
 Heaven's Coin Part 3 at NTV 

 

1995 Japanese television series debuts
Nippon TV dramas